Andre Agassi defeated Marat Safin in the final, 7–6(7–1), 6–2, 4–6, 6–4 to win the singles tennis title at the 1999 Paris Open.

Greg Rusedski was the defending champion, but lost in the second round to Albert Costa.

Seeds 
A champion seed is indicated in bold text while text in italics indicates the round in which that seed was eliminated.  All sixteen seeds received a bye into the second round.

  Andre Agassi (champion)
  Yevgeny Kafelnikov (second round)
  Pete Sampras (third round)
  Todd Martin (second round)
  Gustavo Kuerten (second round)
  Greg Rusedski (second round)
  Nicolas Kiefer (withdrew)
  Richard Krajicek (second round)
  Marcelo Ríos (second round)
  Tim Henman (third round)
  Nicolás Lapentti (semifinals)
  Álex Corretja (second round)
  Tommy Haas (quarterfinals)
  Carlos Moyà (second round)
  Cédric Pioline (quarterfinals)
  Karol Kučera (second round)

Draw

Finals

Top half

Section 1

Section 2

Bottom half

Section 3

Section 4

External links
 1999 Paris Open draw

Singles